Joseph Allen Harris (July 8, 1900 – February 6, 1972) was a Canadian politician. He served in the Legislative Assembly of British Columbia from 1933 to 1937  from the electoral district of South Okanagan, a member of the Liberal party. A research chemist, he was a discoverer of Promethium (element 61).

References

1900s births
1967 deaths
British emigrants to Canada